Joseph William Reed (born January 4, 1998) is an American football wide receiver and return specialist for the Chicago Bears of the National Football League (NFL). He played college football at Virginia.

Early life and high school
Reed grew up in Charlotte Court House, Virginia and attended Randolph-Henry High School. He played high school football. He played running back as a freshman and moved to wide receiver before his sophomore year. He finished his sophomore season with 33 receptions for 900 yards and 21 total touchdowns and had 15 touchdown receptions as a junior. Reed moved from wide receiver to quarterback for his senior season and rushed for 2,100 yards and 38 touchdowns.

College career
As a freshman, Reed served as the Cavaliers' primary kick returner and returned 28 kicks for 678 yards total (25.1 average). As a sophomore, he returned 29 kicks for 861 yards with two touchdowns and caught 23 passes for 244 yards and two touchdowns while also rushing for one touchdown and was named honorable mention All-Atlantic Coast Conference (ACC) as a return specialist. Reed was named third-team All-ACC after finishing his junior season with 25 receptions for 465 yards and seven touchdowns and 707 yards and a touchdown on 26 kickoff returns. As a senior, Reed returned 24 kickoffs for 796 yards (33.2 yards per return) and two touchdowns and was named first-team All-ACC as an all-purpose performer and as a return specialist, as well as a first-team All-American by the Walter Camp Foundation and the Football Writers Association of America and won the Jet Award as the nation's top return specialist. Reed also led Virginia with 77 receptions for 679 yards and seven touchdowns.

Professional career

Los Angeles Chargers
Reed was selected by the Los Angeles Chargers with the 151st overall pick in the fifth round of the 2020 NFL Draft. He scored his first professional touchdown on a seven-yard rush against the Jacksonville Jaguars in Week 7.

On August 31, 2021, Reed was waived by the Chargers and re-signed to the practice squad the next day. He signed a reserve/future contract with the Chargers on January 18, 2022.

On August 30, 2022, Reed was waived by the Chargers and signed to the practice squad the next day.

Chicago Bears
On January 19, 2023, Reed signed a reserve/future contract with the Chicago Bears.

References

External links
Los Angeles Chargers bio
Virginia Cavaliers bio

1998 births
Living people
People from Charlotte County, Virginia
Players of American football from Virginia
American football wide receivers
American football return specialists
Virginia Cavaliers football players
Los Angeles Chargers players
All-American college football players
Chicago Bears players